Kota mandal is one of the 34 mandals in Tirupati district of the state of Andhra Pradesh in India. Its headquarters are located at Kota. The mandal is bounded by Muthukur mandal, Chillakur, Ojili, Chittamur, Vakadu mandals and it also borders Nellore district.

Demographics 

 census, the mandal had a population of 55,226. The total population constitute 28,337 males and 26,889 females —a sex ratio of 949 females per 1000 males. 5,496 children are in the age group of 0–6 years, of which 2,773 are boys and 2,723 are girls —a ratio of 982 per 1000. Scheduled Castes and Scheduled Tribes constitute 16,505 and 8,963 respectively. The average literacy rate stands at 66.07% with 71.8% among males and 60.08% among females.

Administration 
Kota mandal was a part of Nellore district until 2022. It was made part of the newly formed Tirupati district effective from 4 April 2022. It is a part of Gudur revenue division

Towns and villages 

Kota is the most populated settlement and Illukurupadu is the least populated settlement in the mandal.  census, the mandal has 19 settlements, that includes:

Sources:
 Census India 2011 (sub districts)
 Revenue Department of AP

Politics 
Kota mandal is a part of Gudur Assembly constituency and Tirupati Lok Sabha constituency. , the mandal had 29,925 eligible voters with 14,822 male voters and 15,103 female voters.

References

Mandals in Tirupati district